Yaqoub Al Taher (born 27 October 1983) is a retired Kuwaiti footballer who is a defender for the Kuwaiti Premier League club Al Kuwait.

References

1993 births
Living people
Kuwaiti footballers
2011 AFC Asian Cup players
2004 AFC Asian Cup players
Association football defenders
Sportspeople from Kuwait City
Kuwait international footballers
Kuwait SC players
AFC Cup winning players
Al-Yarmouk SC (Kuwait) players
Kuwait Premier League players